James Carl Marshall (born September 8, 1952) is a professional American and Canadian football player who played professionally for the  Saskatchewan Roughriders, Toronto Argonauts, Montreal Alouettes and New Orleans Saints.

References

1952 births
Living people
American football defensive backs
American players of Canadian football
Players of American football from Mississippi
People from Magnolia, Mississippi
Saskatchewan Roughriders players
Toronto Argonauts players
Montreal Alouettes players
Montreal Concordes players
New Orleans Saints players
Jackson State Tigers football players